Streetniks is an album by The Shuffle Demons, recorded over two days. Streetniks sold 15,000 units in Canada, becoming the bestselling independent release in Canadian music history, until Barenaked Ladies broke the record in 1991 with The Yellow Tape.

"Spadina Bus", an ode to the Toronto Transit Commission's Spadina Avenue bus line, was a surprise Top 40 hit for the band. The music video for the track "Out of My House, Roach" also received regular airplay on MuchMusic during the late 1980s.

Track listing
The Shuffle Monster (Underhill) – 6:45
Spadina Bus (Parker/Underhill/Wynston/Murley) – 4:35
Gabi's Gimi Suit (Underhill/Wynston/Murley) – 7:26
Out of My House, Roach (Parker) – 5:35
Vitamin K (In Honor of Keith's India Pale Ale) (Parker) – 4:10
The Puker (Turrin/Patry/Underhill) – 5:06
Bag Rot (Murley) – 9:48
Amsterdam Strut (Underhill) – 6:04
Big Daddy, Fat Boy (Underhill) – 7:35
Pie in the Sky (Underhill/Wynston/White/Milligan/Parker/Saar) – 10:45
Low Life (Underhill) – 0:43

Personnel
 Demon Richard Underhill -  alto & baritone saxes, lukophone, vocals, shouts 
 Demon Mike Murley -  tenor, baritone & alto saxes, vocals, handclaps 
 Demon Dave Parker -  tenor sax, flute, vocals, handclaps, roach stomps 
 Demon Jim Vivian -  bass, vocals, handclaps 
 Demon Stich Wynston -  drums, gongs, bells, windchimes, triangle, goat nails castanets, vocals, handclaps, dancing 
 Demon Perry White -  tenor sax (Amsterdam Strut & Pie in the Sky) 
 Demon Mike Milligan -  bass (Pie in the Sky) 
 Demon Oliver Saar -  alto sax (Pie in the Sky) 
 Demon Gene Hardy -  tenor sax (Pie in the Sky) 
 Demon Markus -  Digeridoo (Pie in the Sky)

The Shuffle Demons albums
1986 albums